Come With Me To Hell II is the second album by Memphis rappers DJ Paul and Lord Infamous.

Track listing
 "Intro"
 "Step Into This Mass"
 "Tear Da Club Up (Original)"
 "Wanna Go To War"
 "Murder Is All On My Mind" (feat. Crunchy Black & Gangsta Boo)
 "South Memphis, Bitch"
 "Side A Outro"
 "Ridin' N Da Chevy Pt. 2" (feat. Juicy J)
 "Grab Da Gauge" (feat. Kingpin Skinny Pimp, Gangsta Boo, & Koopsta Knicca)
 "Paul, Wit' Da 45"
 "Tryna Run Game"
 "Damn, I'm Crazed"
 "Outro"

References

Come with Me 2 Hell Vol. 2 at Trump Tightest Underground Music

1995 albums
DJ Paul albums
Lord Infamous albums
Sequel albums